"Johnny the Horse" is a single by British band Madness from their 1999 album Wonderful. The song struggled to make an impact in the charts after the success of "Lovestruck", and peaked at #44 in the UK Singles Chart.

Carl Smyth explained that "The song Johnny the Horse was inspired by a couple of tramps who I used to see often sitting and drinking cheap booze on a wall locally. One day one of them was crying and, after asking him what was the problem, he told me that his friend had been beaten and killed whilst trying to sleep in an empty building. The name is the kind of tag that Scots or Irish might give to a strong drinking hard man type." Another quote states that "...it's funny how people's lives can unravel y'know. So that's what it's about. Who remembers them, they've had a life and then sort of fall between the cracks."

Although bonus track "You're Wonderful" is listed as a remix, this is the only version of the song to be released.

There is also a 'radio edit' of the single, where the line "Johnny the Horse was kicked to death, he died for entertainment" is replaced by the line "Johnny the Horse, who passed this way, he died for entertainment ". This radio edit also appeared on the 2010 reissue of "Wonderful".

Track listing

Two versions of the single were released on CD.

CD1
 "Johnny the Horse" (Smyth) - 3:19 
 "You're Wonderful (Remix)" (Smyth) - 3:40 
 "Johnny the Horse (Enhanced Video)"

CD2
 "Johnny the Horse"  (Smyth) - 3:19 
 "I Was the One"  (Barson) - 3:07 
 "Dreaming Man" (Smyth/Foreman) - 3:07

Charts

Notes

External links

1999 singles
Madness (band) songs
Songs written by Chas Smash
1999 songs
Virgin Records singles
Song recordings produced by Clive Langer
Song recordings produced by Alan Winstanley
Songs about homelessness